Vladimer Nestorovich Ugrekhelidze  (18 August 1939 – 3 February 2009) was a Soviet-Georgian basketball player who competed in the 1960 Summer Olympics and won a silver medal. Honoured Master of Sport of the USSR.

References

1939 births
Basketball players from Tbilisi
Men's basketball players from Georgia (country)
Soviet men's basketball players
1963 FIBA World Championship players
Olympic basketball players of the Soviet Union
Basketball players at the 1960 Summer Olympics
Olympic silver medalists for the Soviet Union
Olympic medalists in basketball
2009 deaths
Medalists at the 1960 Summer Olympics
Honoured Masters of Sport of the USSR